is a Japanese professional baseball Pitcher for the Fukuoka SoftBank Hawks of Nippon Professional Baseball.

His uncle Hidenori Tanoue played as a Catcher for the Hawks.

Professional career
On October 26, 2020, Tanoue was drafted  by the Fukuoka Softbank Hawks in the 2020 Nippon Professional Baseball draft.

In 2021 season, he played in the Western League of NPB's minor league.

April 12, 2022, he pitched his debut game against the Chiba Lotte Marines as a starting pitcher. In 2022 season, he pitched in two games in the Pacific League.

References

External links

 Career statistics - NPB.jp
 70 Sota Tanoue PLAYERS2022 - Fukuoka SoftBank Hawks Official site

2002 births
Living people
Fukuoka SoftBank Hawks players
Japanese expatriate baseball players in Puerto Rico
Nippon Professional Baseball pitchers
Baseball people from Osaka Prefecture
Gigantes de Carolina players